The South West African Class Hd 2-8-2 of 1912 was a narrow gauge steam locomotive from the German South West Africa era.

In 1912, the German administration in German South West Africa acquired three Class Hd tender locomotives with a  "Mikado" wheel arrangement, for lease to the Otavi Mining and Railway Company to use on the line from Swakopmund to Karibib. When these locomotives were taken onto the roster of the South African Railways after the First World War, they retained their German classification and engine numbers, but with an "SW" prefix to their numbers.

When a system of grouping narrow gauge locomotives into classes was eventually introduced by the South African Railways, they were designated Class NG5 along with similar locomotives which were placed in service by the South African Railways in 1922.

Manufacturer
Increasing traffic demands arising from the copper mines at Tsumeb led to a requirement for more locomotives. Three narrow gauge  steam locomotives were built for the German administration in German South West Africa (GSWA) by Henschel and Son in Germany in 1912. They were designated Class Hd, numbered in the range from 40 to 42, and leased to the Otavi Mining and Railway Company for use on the section between Swakopmund and Karibib.

The "Hd" classification identified the locomotive type as the fourth class to have been built for GSWA by Henschel.

Characteristics
The locomotives were superheated, with Heusinger valve gear, piston valves and outside plate frames. Since they were to be used across the Namib Desert, they were equipped with dust covers to protect the motion from wind-blown sand. Their leading and trailing carrying wheels were not mounted in separate bogie trucks, but were rigidly mounted and arranged as radial axles to allow for sideways motion of the wheels in relation to the locomotive frame.

As built, the sand boxes were mounted on top of the boiler aft of the dome. The engines were equipped for trains with air brakes, which was not yet in use in South Africa at the time.

South African Railways
After the First World War, when the former German colony came under South African administration and all railway operations in South West Africa (SWA) were taken over by the South African Railways (SAR) in 1922, these locomotives retained their Hd classification and engine numbers, but with an "SW" prefix to the numbers. This was to prevent confusion with the two Class NG1 narrow gauge locomotives of the SAR which were numbered NG40 and NG41.

In SAR service, the locomotives were also equipped with vacuum train brakes.

Reclassification
A system of grouping narrow gauge locomotives into classes was only adopted by the SAR somewhere between 1928 and 1930 and at that point these three locomotives, along with six similar locomotives which were built to a revised design and placed in service by the SAR in SWA in 1922, were all designated Class NG5. The original three locomotives retained their original German engine numbers, but the SW prefix was done away with since the two Class NG1 locomotives with duplicate engine numbers were being withdrawn from service at the time.

Service
They remained in service in SWA for their entire working lives, until they were all withdrawn from service when the narrow gauge lines of the SWA system were regauged to Cape gauge in 1960. Since they were unsuitable for use on the narrow gauge line in the Langkloof, all six of the 1922 vintage Class NG5 locomotives were sold as scrap in 1962.

Two of the 1912 vintage ex Class Hd locomotives were preserved. No. 40 was plinthed on the Usakos railway station platform while no. 41 was plinthed outside Otjiwarongo railway station.

Commemoration
A postage stamp depicting the Class Hd locomotive was one of a set of four commemorative South West African postage stamps which were issued on 2 August 1985 to commemorate the narrow gauge locomotives which pioneered railways in the territory. The stamp design was by the noted stamp designer and artist Koos van Ellinckhuijzen.

Illustration

References

0940
2-8-2 locomotives
1D1 locomotives
Henschel locomotives
600 mm gauge railway locomotives
Railway locomotives introduced in 1912
1922 in South Africa